β-Phellandrene synthase (EC 4.2.3.52, geranyl-diphosphate-cyclizing) (phellandrene synthase, (−)-β-phellandrene synthase, (−)-(4S)-β-phellandrene synthase) is an enzyme with systematic name geranyl-diphosphate diphosphate-lyase (cyclizing; β-phellandrene-forming). This enzyme catalyses the following chemical reaction

 geranyl diphosphate  β-phellandrene + diphosphate

This enzyme requires ion Mn2+.

References

External links 
 

EC 4.2.3